Tanpisit Kukalamo (is a Thai professional footballer who plays as an attacking midfielder, he has also been used as a winger for Thai League 3 club Phitsanulok.

Honours

Club
Phitsanulok
 Thai League 3 Northern Region: 2022–23

International
Thailand U-23
 2019 AFF U-22 Youth Championship: Runner up

References

External links

1997 births
Living people
Association football midfielders
Tanpisit Kukalamo
Tanpisit Kukalamo
Tanpisit Kukalamo
Tanpisit Kukalamo